Marie Margareta Lehmann (born Bergqvist, 14 March 1965 in Tyresö, Sweden) is a Swedish sports journalist and television host.

Lehmann is married to retired ice hockey player Tommy Lehmann since 1988.

References

External links

1965 births
Swedish sports journalists
Swedish women journalists
Swedish television hosts
Swedish women television presenters
Living people
People from Tyresö Municipality